Bondarenko is a lunar impact crater on the far side of the Moon. It is located to the northeast of the large, dark-floored crater Tsiolkovskiy, and south of the crater Chauvenet.  This is a worn crater formation with an irregular floor, similar to other craters in the area, which are covered by ejecta from Tsiolkovskiy.

The crater was known as Patsaev G until 1991, when it was renamed by the IAU. Patsaev itself is to the west of Bondarenko.  It is named for Valentin Bondarenko (1937–1961), an early Soviet cosmonaut killed in a training simulator accident.

References

 
 
 
 
 
 
 
 
 
 
 
 

Impact craters on the Moon